The 1932 Louisiana gubernatorial election was held on January 19, 1932.  Like most Southern states between the Reconstruction Era and the Civil Rights Movement, Louisiana's Republican Party had virtually no electoral support.   This meant that the Democratic Party primary held on this date was the real contest over who would be governor.  The election resulted in the election of Oscar K. Allen as governor of Louisiana. Louisiana was one of only two states that held the election on a date other than the first Tuesday following the first Monday of November.

Results  
Democratic Party Primary, January 19

References

Sources 
 State of Louisiana.  Compilation of Primary Election Returns of the Democratic Party, State of Louisiana, 1932.

1932
Gubernatorial
Louisiana